The People's Democracy Party is a communist party in South Korea which aims to establish a people's democracy, in which the proletariat owns the productive forces. The party is also staunchly anti-imperialist and has called for an immediate peace agreement with North Korea and the complete withdrawal of foreign troops from South Korea.

History 
The Founding Preparatory Committee of the Hwansu Welfare Party was formed on 12 July 2016 and it held a press conference on 18 July. The inauguration ceremony of the Hwansu Welfare Party was subsequently held on 5 November 2016, and the party registered with the National Election Commission (NEC) on 21 November.

The Hwansu Welfare Party merged with organizations affiliated with the National Liberation and People's Democracy political camps on 15 August 2017. The party subsequently renamed itself the People's Democracy Party-Hwansu Welfare Party, later shortened to the "People's Democracy Party".

Three members of the People's Democracy Party were arrested by police on 8 November 2017 for distributing leaflets and hanging a banner critical of U.S. President Donald Trump's visit to Korea. During the same afternoon, the People's Democracy Party held a press conference in front of the Mapo Police Station and said, "Since yesterday [when President Trump arrived], a total of seven party members were arrested for doing the same thing in downtown Seoul, and four of them have been released."

The People's Democracy Party issued a statement in solidarity with four leaders of the anti-racist protests in Denver, Colorado, U.S., who were arrested by local authorities in late 2020.

Ideology and policies 
The People's Democracy Party is a communist party which aims to establish a people's democracy in South Korea, in which workers, farmers, and small merchants (i.e. the proletariat and petite bourgeoisie) are the owners of the productive forces. However, since the National Security Act prevents communist from working or active in South Korea, the PDP does not explicitly support "communism" (공산주의), but instead uses the indirect expression "communalism" (공동주의).

The party has called for an immediate end to the Korean conflict by striking a peace deal with North Korea and withdrawing foreign troops from South Korea. The party program also calls for free housing, education, and medical care, as well as an end to conscription in South Korea.

The party argues that "South  is a complete colony occupied by the U.S. military, is politically oppressed by the U.S., and is economically subordinate to imperialist countries, including the U.S.," and therefore "True peace is possible only without imperialism; the head of imperialism is the U.S."

Election results

Legislative elections

See also 
 Minjung

Notes

References

External links
  

2016 establishments in South Korea
Anti-imperialism in Korea
Communalism
Communist parties in South Korea
Far-left politics in South Korea
Minjung
Political parties established in 2016